Sussex is a town in Kings County, New Brunswick, Canada.  
Sussex is located in south central New Brunswick, between the province's three largest cities, Saint John, Moncton, and Fredericton.

It is home to Atlantic Canada's largest hot air balloon festival.

On 1 January 2023, Sussex amalgamated with the village of Sussex Corner and part of the local service district of the parish of Sussex. Revised census figures have not been released, although combining the 2016 census numbers the total population would be approximately 5,900.

History

In 1857 the European and North American Railway was opened, connecting the farming communities of the Kennebecasis River valley with Saint John and Moncton. Sussex was incorporated in accordance with Chapter 44 of the Town Incorporation Act of 1896 and was officially established as a Town on June 2, 1904. The settlers were for the most part British Loyalists who had fled the American Revolution in 1776, with many Irish refugees of the Great Famine from the mid-19th century settling in the nearby farming communities.

In 1885, the Sussex Military Camp was established on the eastern edge of the town. The facility was closed following the Second World War and the town purchased the land to expand the municipal boundaries. Today the agricultural exhibition and some areas remain as open land on the former site of Camp Sussex.

Sussex underwent several changes in the post-war period. In the early 1960s, several local roads were upgraded as part of the Trans-Canada Highway project which saw Route 2 pass immediately north of the town between Fredericton and Moncton. At the same time, a series of local roads in the Kennebecasis River valley were designated as Route 1, running from an interchange with the Trans-Canada at Sussex, southwest to Saint John.

The creation of Sussex as a highway interchange in this post-war period led to some transportation planners in New Brunswick calling for the consolidation or closure of the Fredericton, Saint John and Moncton airports to be replaced by a single airport located in Sussex to serve all three population centres of southern New Brunswick; this being in the late 1950s/early 1960s before these facilities underwent considerable expansion. Sussex is still considered the best strategically located town, being in the centre of what has been called New Brunswick's "Golden Triangle".

Potash was subsequently discovered in large quantities in the area surrounding Sussex, with the deposit being the second largest in the world after an area in Saskatchewan. Three mines were built near the town, two at Penobsquis,  to the east, and another at Cassidy Lake (no longer operational),  to the southwest. CN Rail built track to serve both mines, which employed hundreds from the surrounding area. Since 2003, natural gas has been produced from the McCully field near Sussex. Recent drops of the potash market combined with underground structural issues caused the Potash Corporation of Saskatchewan to close its Penobsquis/Picadilly mining operation in 2018. 

Sussex also began to see a growing tourism trade, with many flocking to see the collection of wood-constructed covered bridges throughout the central area of Kings County. As the heart of Kings County with its 16 covered bridges, Sussex is known as the Covered Bridge Capital of Atlantic Canada. Eight of these wooden structures are within a ten-minute drive of town hall. An agricultural fair draws visitors each August (marking 113 years in 2008), as well as the establishment of southern New Brunswick's only alpine ski hill in the Caledonia Mountains southeast of the town at Poley Mountain. 26 murals were created during the summers of 2006 and 2007, establishing its reputation as the Mural Capital of Atlantic Canada. An international hot air balloon festival is held every September, and Canada's largest outdoor flea market each August.

The town entered economic difficulty during the late 1990s after the Cassidy Lake potash mine flooded, resulting in hundreds of lay-offs. At the same time, Route 1 was extended east on the old Trans-Canada alignment to an interchange at River Glade near Petitcodiac and Route 10 was extended on the old Trans-Canada from an interchange with the new Route 2 alignment at Young's Cove Road south to Sussex.

Today, Sussex is primarily a regional service centre for the surrounding agricultural communities of the upper Kennebecasis River valley, as well as a highway service centre on Route 1, the primary highway between Moncton and Saint John, as well as being the most heavily travelled route in the Maritimes to the United States. Sussex is also home to Kingswood University (formerly Bethany Bible College), the only college in Canada owned by the Wesleyan Church.
  
The town is home to Sussex Golden Ginger Ale, a maritime beverage. Sussex claims to be the birthplace of the ice cream cone. Sussex titles itself as the Dairy Capital of New Brunswick.

Her Majesty Queen Elizabeth II visited the town as part of her Golden Jubilee tour of Canada. On October 12, 2002, she attended the opening of a new wing of Sussex Elementary School, unveiling a commemorative plaque at the event. She then visited Princess Louise Park for an agricultural exhibition. While there, it was announced that the community hall would be renamed Jubilee Hall in her honour. Both appearances drew thousands of visitors from Sussex and beyond.

Media
Kings County Record - weekly newspaper
CJCW AM 590, local radio station
CITA 107.3 FM, a Moncton Christian radio station rebroadcaster 
CBC Radio One 106.7 FM

Atlantic International Balloon Fiesta 

The largest hot airballoon festival in Atlantic Canada is held each summer in Sussex. On the weekend after Labour Day, Sussex hosts up to 35,000 visitors who come to watch 40 hot air balloons. Along with the twice-daily flights, the event includes a giant craft fair, a free outdoor concert and an amusement park. the festival has been held since 1985. Some residents of Sussex wake up early to get a look at the balloons, with some going "balloon chasing" and assisting in the taking down of balloons.

Princess Louise Park Show Centre
The Princess Louise Park Show Centre is Eastern Canada's premier Agricultural Exhibition Center. Located in Sussex, this facility is the host of many shows that include equine, dogs, livestock, sales and exhibitions as well as 4H and youth group activities. It is known as the heart of Canada's picture province (New Brunswick). Princess Louise Park Show Centre is a board owned and operated exhibition ground that was founded in 1985. It hosts shows attracting people from all over the county, province, and country. There are many owners and sponsors of this facility, a summer staff and a year-round general manager. There is also an alternate purpose for the facility during the winter months; it doubles as a storage facility for RVs and trailers. The centre has five barns with stalls, three riding rings, and electrical and sewage hookups. The facility is one of the most advanced exhibition grounds in Atlantic Canada.

Sussex Regional High School
Sussex Regional High School is a Canadian secondary school that offers classes from grades 9 through 12 to the greater Sussex region and its surrounding municipalities. The school has a capacity of over 1,000 students and houses industrial, science and business labs, as well as a first-class theatrical complex and a library, gymnasium and soccer pitch.

Sussex Christian School
Sussex Christian School was founded in 1982 and is a Canadian elementary, middle and secondary school that offers classes from kindergarten through grade 12. Sussex Christian School also has a daycare, preschool, and after school programing through our Little Lights and Shine Centres to the greater Sussex region and its surrounding municipalities. The school has a approximately 200 students.

Demographics

Most people in Sussex have some Scottish, French, English, or Irish ancestry. There are smaller groups of German and Dutch lineage. The town is almost universally anglophone, being in the heart of English-speaking southern New Brunswick.

Climate

Notable people
Julian Austin, country music artist
Mike Eagles, NHL hockey player, 1983-2000
Christian Meier, cyclist
William Pugsley, lawyer and 11th Premier of New Brunswick
Melanie Robillard, curling World Champion 2010
Tim Steeves, comedian, 1964-2022
Ellen Watters, cyclist, 1988-2016

See also
List of communities in New Brunswick

References

External links 

 Town website

Communities in Kings County, New Brunswick
Towns in New Brunswick